Embratel Star One is a Brazilian communication satellite company. It is a subsidiary of Embratel.

History 
Embratel Star One was created in December 2000, as an arm of Embratel in the area of operation and administration of satellites.

Satellite fleet 
Embratel Star One own a small fleet of satellites.

 Star One C1 was launched atop an Ariane 5 ECA rocket at 22:06 UTC on 14 November 2007. This launch had previously been delayed from 9 November 2007 due to a problem with the launch vehicle, and then from 12 November 2007 due to a problem with the launch pad. Star One C1 was built by Alcatel Alenia Space based on a Spacebus 3000 B3 satellite bus.
 Star One C2, the second spacecraft, was launched at 22:17 UTC on 18 April 2008, also aboard an Ariane 5 ECA.
 Star One C3, the third spacecraft, was launched at 22:05 UTC on 10 November 2012, also aboard an Ariane 5 ECA.

Satellites

References

External links 
 Arianespace
 Star One C1 at LyngSat
 Star One C2 at LyngSat

Telecommunications companies of Brazil
Aerospace companies of Brazil
Brazilian brands
Companies based in Rio de Janeiro (city)
Telecommunications companies established in 2000
2000 establishments in Brazil